MPTA may refer to:

 MPTA — Main Propulsion Test Article – part of the US Space Shuttle programme, see Orbiter Vehicle Designation
 MPTA-098 (formerly MPTA)
 MPTA-ET
 Michigan Public Transit Association
 Minnesota Public Television Association